Korgi may refer to:

Korgi (book)
Korgi, Kundapura, a village in Kundapura taluk, Udupi district, Karnataka, India

See also
Corgi (disambiguation)